Janice Y. Tsoh is a Chinese-American clinical psychologist and a Professor of Psychiatry at the University of California, San Francisco Weill Institute for Neurosciences.

Early life and education 
Dr. Tsoh is from Hong Kong. She completed a B.A. in psychology from Binghamton University in 1990. In 1993, she earned a M.A. in clinical psychology from University of Rhode Island (URI). She conducted a residency in clinical psychology from 1994 to 1995 at University of Mississippi Medical Center. She earned a Ph.D. in clinical psychology from URI in 1995. She conducted postdoctoral studies in cancer prevention at University of Texas MD Anderson Cancer Center from 1995 to 1997. Tsoh was a postdoc studying substance abuse at University of California, San Francisco (UCSF) from 1997 to 1999. She completed a certificate in clinical research from UCSF in 2001 to 2002.

Career 
Tsoh began her UCSF career as an assistant research psychologist in 1999. Her current work focuses on promoting health equity by empowering individuals to make informed health decisions, such quitting tobacco use or obtaining needed cancer screenings. Her teaching and mentorship focuses on groups underrepresented in the field of tobacco control or other health disciplines, and many focus on diverse populations. She is an attending medical staff at the Langley Porter Psychiatric Institute.

References 

Living people
Year of birth missing (living people)
Binghamton University alumni
University of Rhode Island alumni
University of California, San Francisco faculty
American people of Chinese descent
Hong Kong women scientists
American clinical psychologists
American women psychologists
Hong Kong scientists
20th-century American scientists
20th-century Chinese scientists
20th-century American women scientists
21st-century American scientists
21st-century Chinese scientists
21st-century American women scientists
Chinese psychologists
Chinese women psychologists
Hong Kong women psychologists
Hong Kong emigrants to the United States